Cloe is an unincorporated community in Jefferson County, in the U.S. state of Pennsylvania.

History
A post office called Cloe was established in 1892, and remained in operation until 1964. In 1917, Cloe was the only post office in Bell Township.

References

Unincorporated communities in Jefferson County, Pennsylvania
Unincorporated communities in Pennsylvania